Middle Wheeling Creek is a  long 3rd order tributary to Little Wheeling Creek in Ohio County, West Virginia.

Course 
Middle Wheeling Creek rises about 3 miles southwest of Claysville, Pennsylvania, in Washington County and then flows west into Ohio County, West Virginia to join Little Wheeling Creek in Triadelphia.

Watershed 
Middle Wheeling Creek drains  of area, receives about 41.1 in/year of precipitation, has a wetness index of 295.46, and is about 61% forested.

See also 
 List of rivers of Pennsylvania
 List of rivers of West Virginia

References 

Rivers of Washington County, Pennsylvania
Rivers of Ohio County, West Virginia
Rivers of Pennsylvania
Rivers of West Virginia